Manaivi Ready is a 1987 Indian Tamil-language comedy film, Produced and directed by Pandiarajan. The film stars Pandiarajan, Debashree Roy, K. A. Thangavelu, R. S. Manohar, Manorama. Roy was credited as Sinthamani. It was her only film in Tamil.

Cast 

 Pandiarajan as Radha
 Debashree Roy as Chintamani
 K. A. Thangavelu as Thangappan
 R. S. Manohar  as Radha's father
 Pasi Narayanan as Tamil teacher
 K. K. Soundar as Chintamani's father
 Manorama as Chintamani's aunt
 Kumarimuthu 
 Sivaraman as Postman
 MLA Thangaraj
 Pratap K. Pothen  as Doctor - Voice by S. N. Surendar

Soundtrack 
All songs were written by Vaali and composed by Ilaiyaraaja.

References

External links 
 

1987 films
Indian comedy films
Films scored by Ilaiyaraaja
1980s Tamil-language films
1987 comedy films